US Highland is a motorcycle manufacturer based in Oklahoma. It was formed by Mats Malmberg, formerly of Swedish Highland Motorcycles AB, when negotiations to sell Highland to ATK fell through. US Highland's  factory opened in Tulsa on June 1, 2010 and is expected to produce hundreds of off-road motorcycles a year.

Highland offers motorcycles built to the customer's specifications utilizing modular construction based on two engines, a single and a 60-degree V-twin, and a few frames. The company has stated it plans to build out a dealer network in the United States in 2011–2012.

Highland has announced that they will also produce an electric motorcycle utilizing a wheel hub motor.

On July 10, 2010, Malmberg and two other executives of US Highland were killed when their small plane, returning from a business trip in Michigan, crashed in Tulsa's Mohawk Park after they radioed that they were low on fuel and requested an unscheduled landing at nearby Tulsa International Airport.

July 2017
- UHLN (OTCBB) (US Highlands Inc) has switched company path into a holdings company purchasing established restaurant chains and franchises under the ticker symbol CZNI - Cruzani, Inc.

References

Companies traded over-the-counter in the United States
Motorcycle manufacturers of the United States
Companies based in Tulsa, Oklahoma